Péter Sidi (born 11 September 1978 in Komárom) is a Hungarian sport shooter. He has been world champion in the 50 m rifle 3 positions, as well as winning silver medals in the 300 m rifle prone and the men's 10 metre air rifle.  He has also won bronze medals in the 50 metre rifle 3 positions and the 50 m rifle prone team event. He currently holds the qualification world record in 10 m Air Rifle.

He has competed at five Olympic Games, 2000, 2004, 2008, 2012, and 2016, in the Men's 10 metre air rifle, Men's 50 metre rifle prone and Men's 50 metre rifle 3 positions.  His best results are 5th at the men's 10 m air rifle in 2016 and 6th in the men's 50 metre rifle 3 positions.

On 21 June 2021 Peter Sidi has been handed a two year ban by the Hungarian federation, after being proven to have gained access to the hotel room of fellow sports shooter Istvan Peni, who produced a positive dopping test later, during the ISSF World Cup event in India in March 2021.

References

Hungarian male sport shooters
Living people
Olympic shooters of Hungary
Shooters at the 2000 Summer Olympics
Shooters at the 2004 Summer Olympics
Shooters at the 2008 Summer Olympics
Shooters at the 2012 Summer Olympics
Shooters at the 2016 Summer Olympics
1978 births
European Games competitors for Hungary
Shooters at the 2015 European Games
Shooters at the 2019 European Games
21st-century Hungarian people